AK Leporis is a variable star in the southern constellation of Lepus the hare. It has an apparent visual magnitude of 6.141, so, according to the Bortle scale, it is faintly visible from rural skies at night. This star forms a visual double with Gamma Leporis—the two have an angular separation of 97″, making them difficult to separate with the naked eye even under the best conditions. Both Gamma Leporis and AK Leporis are members of the Ursa Major Moving Group of stars that share a common  motion through space.

This is a BY Draconis variable star that undergoes slight brightness variations due to stellar activity. Differential rotation causes changes to the periodicity of the variation depending on the latitude of the activity. X-ray emission has been detected from AK Leporis, and it is located at or near a radio source.

Infrared observation of this star shows a large excess at a wavelength of 24 µm. This may be explained by the proximity of Gamma Leporis to the line of sight, or there may be a red dwarf companion or a dust disc. There is no excess observed at 70 µm.

References

Lepus (constellation)
Double stars
Ursa Major Moving Group
K-type main-sequence stars
Leporis, AK
38392
1982
Durchmusterung objects